The Municipal Building, or City Hall, of El Dorado, Arkansas is located at 204 North West Street.

Description and history 
The two-story masonry building was designed by Eugene John Stern and built in 1927, during El Dorado's oil boom years. The front and sides are finished in dressed limestone, while the rear is finished in buff brick. The main facade has a combination of Classical Revival and Art Deco features, with a central projecting entry with a three-story tower.

The building was listed on the National Register of Historic Places on June 30, 1983.

See also
National Register of Historic Places listings in Union County, Arkansas

References

City and town halls on the National Register of Historic Places in Arkansas
Neoclassical architecture in Arkansas
Government buildings completed in 1927
Buildings and structures in El Dorado, Arkansas
National Register of Historic Places in Union County, Arkansas
1927 establishments in Arkansas
Art Deco architecture in Arkansas